John Typhane was Archdeacon of Totnes from 1421 until 1433.

References

Archdeacons of Totnes
15th-century English people